Eric James Lowell (born 8 March 1935) is an English former footballer who played in the Football League for Derby County and Stoke City.

Career
Lowell was born in Stoke-on-Trent but began his career with Derby County where he played and scored in one match in the 1954–55 season before he joined Stoke City. He played seven matches for Stoke during the 1955–56 season and scored three goals all of which came in the first month of the season. Despite this he never managed to claim a place in the first team and left for Stafford Rangers.

Career statistics

References

English footballers
Derby County F.C. players
Stoke City F.C. players
Stafford Rangers F.C. players
English Football League players
1935 births
Living people
Association football forwards